The 2014 Women's Junior South American Volleyball Championship was the 22nd edition of the tournament, organised by South America's governing volleyball body, the Confederación Sudamericana de Voleibol (CSV). The top two teams qualified for the 2015 Junior World Championship.

Competing nations
The following national teams participated in the tournament, teams were seeded according to how they finished in the previous edition of the tournament:

Competition format
The championship consisted of a single round-robin pool between the six teams, the champion was determined from the ranking after the round.

Competition

All times are Colombia Standard Time (UTC-5)

|}

 

 

 
 
 
 
 
|}

Final standing

All-Star Team

Most Valuable Player

Best Opposite

Best Outside Hitters

 

Best Middle Blockers

Best Setter

Best Libero

External links
CSV official website

Women's South American Volleyball Championships
S
Volleyball
International volleyball competitions hosted by Colombia
Youth volleyball